Echo Park is a neighborhood of Central Los Angeles, California.

Echo Park may also refer to:

 Echo Park (Colorado), at the confluence of the Green and Yampa Rivers in Dinosaur National Monument
 Echo Park Dam, a proposed dam at this site that was never built
 Echo Park (1986 film), a 1986 film by Robert Dornhelm
 Echo Park (2014 film), a 2015 film by Amanda Marsalis
 "Echo Park", the second episode of the television series Law & Order: Los Angeles
 Echo Park (novel), a 2006 novel by Michael Connelly
 Echo Park (album), a 2001 album by the British band Feeder
 Echo Park, an album by Keith Barbour, or the title track